The Shuvee Stakes is a Grade II American Thoroughbred horse race for fillies and mares that are three years old or older over a distance of   miles on the dirt track scheduled annually in August at Saratoga Race Course in Saratoga Springs, New York. The event currently carries a purse of $200,000.

History

The race was named after the great U.S. Racing Hall of Fame filly, Shuvee, winner of the 1969 Fillies Triple Crown.

The inaugural running of the event was on 16 May 1976 at Belmont Park as the Shuvee Handicap as a one-mile event. The winner Proud Delta made an immediate impact for the event as she continued her winning ways to be crowned US Champion Older Dirt Female Horse.

The following year the distance for the event was increased to  miles and for the third running in 1978 the event was classified as a Grade II.

The event was upgraded to Grade I in 1986, the year Lady's Secret won the event en route to a Breeders' Cup Distaff victory at Santa Anita Park and U.S. Horse of the Year honors.

In 1995 the distance for the event reverted to its original one mile.

In 1997 the event was downgraded to Grade II and in 2012 the event was not held. 
NYRA moved the event to Saratoga for 2013 as they expanded the number of racing dates at that track. The event was downgraded to Grade III for its first running at the new track and the event holds this classification to date. Also that year the distance was increased to a mile-and-an-eighth.

Other notable mares to have won this race are 1995 winner Inside Information who won the event as the Shug McGaughey trained entry with Regal Solution defeating the short favorite and 1994 winner Sky Beauty and US Champion Older Dirt Female Horse. Later that year Inside Information would win the Breeders' Cup Distaff and be crowned US Champion Older Dirt Female Horse. The 1997 winner Hidden Lake would also later that year be voted US Champion Older Dirt Female Horse. Stopchargingmaria, in 2015, was the last Shuvee winner to go on to win the Breeders' Cup Distaff.

In 2022, the American Graded Stakes Committee upgraded the event back to Grade II.

Records
Speed record:
1 mile: 1:34.23 – Society Selection (2005) 
 miles:  1:40.40 – Dance Number  (1983)
 miles: 1:49.35 – Farrell   (2018)

Largest Winning Margin:
 lengths –  Paid Up Subscriber  (2017)

Most wins:
 No horse has won this race more than once.

Most wins by a jockey:
 5 – John Velazquez (1998, 2004, 2013, 2016, 2017)
  
Most wins by a trainer:
 5 – H. Allen Jerkens (1992, 1994, 2002, 2005, 2007)

Most wins by an owner:
 2 – Ogden Phipps (1983, 1988)
 2 – Eugene V. Klein (1985, 1986)
 2 – Ogden Mills Phipps (1995, 2004)

Winners
{| class="wikitable sortable"
|-
! Year
! Winner
! Age
! Jockey
! Trainer
! Owner
! Distance
! Time
! Purse
! Grade
! Ref
|-style="font-size:90%; background-color:white"
|align="left" colspan=11|At Saratoga – Shuvee Stakes
|-style="font-size:90%;
|align=center |2022
|Clairiere
|align=center |4
|Joel Rosario
|Steve Asmussen
|Stonestreet Stables
|align=center | miles
|align=center |1:51.96
|align=center |$186,000
|align=center |II 
|
|-style="font-size:90%;"
|align=center |2021
|Royal Flag
|align=center |5
|Joel Rosario
|Chad C. Brown 
|William S. Farish III 
|align=center | miles
|align=center |1:49.42
|align=center |$200,000
|align=center |III
|
|-style="font-size:90%;"
|align=center |2020
|Letruska
|align=center |4
|Joel Rosario
| Fausto Gutierrez 
|St. George Stable 
|align=center | miles
|align=center |1:48.94
|align=center |$125,000
|align=center |III
|
|-style="font-size:90%;"
|align=center |2019
|Golden Award
|align=center |4
|Tyler Gaffalione
|William I. Mott
|Summer Wind Equine
|align=center | miles
|align=center |1:49.64
|align=center |$194,000
|align=center |III
|
|-style="font-size:90%;"
|align=center |2018
|Farrell
|align=center |4
|Channing Hill
|Wayne M. Catalano
|Coffeepot Stables
|align=center | miles
|align=center |1:49.35
|align=center |$200,000
|align=center |III
|
|-style="font-size:90%; background-color:white"
|align="left" colspan=11|Shuvee Handicap
|-style="font-size:90%;"
|align=center |2017
|
|align=center |5
|John R. Velazquez
|Chad C. Brown
|Allen Stable & Peter M. Brant
|align=center | miles
|align=center |1:51.31
|align=center |$180,000
|align=center |III
|
|-style="font-size:90%;"
|align=center |2016
|Curalina
|align=center |4
|John R. Velazquez
|Todd A. Pletcher
|Eclipse Thoroughbred Partners 
|align=center | miles
|align=center |1:49.85
|align=center |$190,000
|align=center |III
|
|-style="font-size:90%;"
|align=center |2015
|Stopchargingmaria
|align=center |4
|Javier Castellano
|Todd A. Pletcher
|Town and Country Farms  
|align=center | miles
|align=center |1:49.37
|align=center |$200,000
|align=center |III
|
|-style="font-size:90%;"
|align=center |2014
|Antipathy
|align=center |4
|Irad Ortiz Jr.
|Kiaran P. McLaughlin
|Godolphin Racing
|align=center | miles
|align=center |1:52.80
|align=center |$200,000
|align=center |III
|
|-style="font-size:90%;"
|align=center |2013
|Authenticity
|align=center |6
|John R. Velazquez
|Todd A. Pletcher
|Padua Stables
|align=center | miles
|align=center |1:52.33
|align=center |$200,000
|align=center |III
|
|-style="font-size:90%; background-color:white"
|align="center" |2012
|align="center" colspan=10|Race not held
|-style="font-size:90%; background-color:white"
|align="left" colspan=11|At Belmont Park|-style="font-size:90%;"
|align=center |2011
|Awesome Maria
|align=center |4
|Javier Castellano
|Todd A. Pletcher
| Robsham Stables 
|align=center |1 mile
|align=center |1:35.19
|align=center |$147,000
|align=center |II
|
|-style="font-size:90%;"
|align=center |2010
|Funny Moon
|align=center |4
|Alan Garcia
|Christophe Clement
|Mrs. C. Wilson McNeely III
|align=center |1 mile
|align=center |1:36.70
|align=center |$147,000
|align=center |II
|
|-style="font-size:90%;"
|align=center |2009
|Seattle Smooth
|align=center |4
|
|Anthony W. Dutrow
|Mercedes Stable
|align=center |1 mile
|align=center |1:35.94
|align=center |$150,000
|align=center |II
|
|-style="font-size:90%;"
|align=center |2008
|Cowgirls Don't Cry
|align=center |4
|Michael J. Luzzi
|Kiaran P. McLaughlin
|Jeff Singer
|align=center |1 mile
|align=center |1:37.31
|align=center |$150,000
|align=center |II
|
|-style="font-size:90%;"
|align=center |2007
|Teammate
|align=center |4
|Cornelio Velásquez
|H. Allen Jerkens
|H. Joseph Allen
|align=center |1 mile
|align=center |1:38.19
|align=center |$150,000
|align=center |II
|
|-style="font-size:90%;"
|align=center |2006
|Take D' Tour
|align=center |5
|Cornelio Velásquez
|David Fawkes
|Alice Muller
|align=center |1 mile
|align=center |1:36.10
|align=center |$147,000
|align=center |II
|
|-style="font-size:90%;"
|align=center |2005
|Society Selection
|align=center |4
|Eibar Coa
|H. Allen Jerkens
| Irving & Marjorie Cowan 
|align=center |1 mile
|align=center |1:34.23
|align=center |$196,000
|align=center |II
|
|-style="font-size:90%;"
|align=center |2004
|Storm Flag Flying
|align=center |4
|John R. Velazquez
|
|Ogden Mills Phipps et al.
|align=center |1 mile
|align=center |1:36.10
|align=center |$200,000
|align=center |II
|
|-style="font-size:90%;"
|align=center |2003
|Wild Spirit (CHI)
|align=center |4
|Javier Castellano
|Robert J. Frankel
|Sumaya U.S. Stable
|align=center |1 mile
|align=center |1:34.51
|align=center |$200,000
|align=center |II
|
|-style="font-size:90%;"
|align=center |2002
|Shiny Band
|align=center |4
|Robbie Davis
|H. Allen Jerkens
|Bohemia Stable
|align=center |1 mile
|align=center |1:34.95
|align=center |$200,000
|align=center |II
|
|-style="font-size:90%;"
|align=center |2001
|Apple of Kent
|align=center |5
|Richard Migliore
|John C. Kimmel
|Juddmonte Farms
|align=center |1 mile
|align=center |1:35.16
|align=center |$200,000
|align=center |II
|
|-style="font-size:90%;"
|align=center |2000
|Beautiful Pleasure
|align=center |5
|Jorge F. Chavez
|John T. Ward Jr.
|John C. Oxley
|align=center |1 mile
|align=center |1:35.65
|align=center |$200,000
|align=center |II
|
|-style="font-size:90%;"
|align=center |1999
|Catinca
|align=center |4
|Richard Migliore
|John C. Kimmel
|Robert K. Waxman
|align=center |1 mile
|align=center |1:34.38
|align=center |$150,000
|align=center |II
|
|-style="font-size:90%;"
|align=center |1998
|Colonial Minstrel
|align=center |4
|John R. Velazquez
|Mark A. Hennig
|Edward P. Evans
|align=center |1 mile
|align=center |1:36.20
|align=center |$150,000
|align=center |II
|
|-style="font-size:90%;"
|align=center |1997
|Hidden Lake
|align=center |4
|Richard Migliore
|John C. Kimmel
|Robert N. Clay
|align=center |1 mile
|align=center |1:35.27
|align=center |$150,000
|align=center |II
|
|-style="font-size:90%;"
|align=center |1996
|Clear Mandate
|align=center |4
|Julie Krone
|George R. Arnold II
|G. Watts Humphrey Jr.
|align=center |1 mile
|align=center |1:35.01
|align=center |$153,300
|align=center |I
|
|-style="font-size:90%;"
|align=center |1995
|§ Inside Information
|align=center |4
|José A. Santos
|Claude R. McGaughey III
|Ogden Mills Phipps
|align=center |1 mile
|align=center |1:35.10
|align=center |$129,689
|align=center |I
|
|-style="font-size:90%;"
|align=center |1994
|Sky Beauty
|align=center |4
|Mike E. Smith
|H. Allen Jerkens
|Georgia E. Hofmann
|align=center | miles
|align=center |1:40.60
|align=center |$150,000
|align=center |I
|
|-style="font-size:90%;"
|align=center |1993
|
|align=center |4
|Chris Antley
|William V. Terrill
|Valley View Farm
|align=center | miles
|align=center |1:43.11
|align=center |$150,000
|align=center |I
|
|-style="font-size:90%;"
|align=center |1992
|Missy's Mirage
|align=center |4
|Eddie Maple
|H. Allen Jerkens
|Middletown Stable
|align=center | miles
|align=center |1:40.74
|align=center |$171,600
|align=center |I
|
|-style="font-size:90%;"
|align=center |1991
|A Wild Ride
|align=center |4
|Mike E. Smith
|D. Wayne Lukas
| Yoshida Zeyna 
|align=center | miles
|align=center |1:42.40
|align=center |$171,900
|align=center |I
|
|-style="font-size:90%;"
|align=center |1990
|Tis Juliet
|align=center |4
|Richard Migliore
|D. Wayne Lukas
|Calumet Farm
|align=center | miles
|align=center |1:43.00
|align=center |$171,300
|align=center |I
|
|-style="font-size:90%;"
|align=center |1989
|Banker's Lady
|align=center |4
|Ángel Cordero Jr.
|Philip M. Hauswald
| Edward A. Cox Jr. 
|align=center | miles
|align=center |1:40.80
|align=center |$174,300 
|align=center |I
|
|-style="font-size:90%;"
|align=center |1988
|Personal Ensign
|align=center |4
|Randy Romero
|Claude R. McGaughey III
|Ogden Phipps
|align=center | miles
|align=center |1:41.60
|align=center |$170,100
|align=center |I
|
|-style="font-size:90%;"
|align=center |1987
|Ms. Eloise
|align=center |4
|Robbie Davis
|Philip G. Johnson
|Margaret E. Grimm
|align=center | miles
|align=center |1:41.80
|align=center |$179,700
|align=center |I
|
|-style="font-size:90%;"
|align=center |1986
|Lady's Secret
|align=center |4
|Pat Day
|D. Wayne Lukas
|Eugene V. Klein
|align=center | miles
|align=center |1:41.80
|align=center |$113,800
|align=center |I
|
|-style="font-size:90%;"
|align=center |1985
|Life's Magic
|align=center |4
|Jorge Velásquez
|D. Wayne Lukas
|Eugene V. Klein
|align=center | miles
|align=center |1:42.40
|align=center |$172,000
|align=center |II 
|
|-style="font-size:90%;"
|align=center |1984
|Queen of Song
|align=center |5
|Sam Maple
|Claude R. McGaughey III
|Parrish Hill Farm
|align=center | miles
|align=center |1:43.00
|align=center |$121,400
|align=center |II
|
|-style="font-size:90%;"
|align=center |1983
|Dance Number
|align=center |4
|Ángel Cordero Jr.
|Angel Penna Sr.
|Ogden Phipps
|align=center | miles
|align=center |1:40.40
|align=center |$82,500
|align=center |II
|
|-style="font-size:90%;"
|align=center |1982
|Anti Lib
|align=center |4
|Jacinto Vásquez
|David A. Whiteley
|Pen-Y-Bryn Farm
|align=center | miles
|align=center |1:41.60
|align=center |$55,700
|align=center |II
|
|-style="font-size:90%;"
|align=center |1981
|Chain Bracelet
|align=center |4
|Ruben Hernandez
|James W. Maloney Jr.
|Shirley H. Taylor
|align=center | miles
|align=center |1:42.80
|align=center |$55,500
|align=center |II
|
|-style="font-size:90%;"
|align=center |1980
|Alada
|align=center |4
|Jeffrey Fell
|Robert G. van Wert
|Meadow Stable
|align=center | miles
|align=center |1:43.00
|align=center |$54,100
|align=center |II 
|
|-style="font-size:90%;"
|align=center |1979
| Pearl Necklace
|align=center |5
|Jeffrey Fell
|Roger Laurin
|Reginald N. Webster
|align=center | miles
|align=center |1:41.40
|align=center |$53,800
|align=center |II 
|
|-style="font-size:90%;"
|align=center |1978
|One Sum
|align=center |4
|Ruben Hernandez
|Luis Barrera
|Charles T. Wilson Jr.
|align=center | miles
|align=center |1:44.00
|align=center |$53,000
|align=center |II
|
|-style="font-size:90%;"
|align=center |1977
|† Mississippi Mud
|align=center |4
|Jacinto Vásquez
|Charles Peoples
|Mrs. Bayard Sharp
|align=center | miles
|align=center |1:43.60
|align=center |$54,600
|align=center | 
|
|-style="font-size:90%;"
|align=center |1976
|Proud Delta
|align=center |4
|Jorge Velásquez
|Peter M. Howe
|Montpelier Stable
|align=center |1 mile
|align=center |1:35.00
|align=center |$56,350
|align=center | 
|
|}Notes:'''

§ Ran as an entry

† In the 1977 running, Secret Lanvin finished first but was disqualified for interference and was placed third. Mississippi Mud was declared the winner.

See also
List of American and Canadian Graded races

References

Graded stakes races in the United States
Horse races in New York (state)
Mile category horse races for fillies and mares
Recurring sporting events established in 1976
Saratoga Race Course
1976 establishments in New York (state)
Grade 3 stakes races in the United States